Veradia was a genus of beetle in the family Carabidae with a single species, Veradia brisbanensis.  It is now considered a synonym of the genus Lecanomerus Chaudoir, 1850

References

Harpalinae